The Price of Freedom is a 2021 American documentary film by Judd Ehrlich about the National Rifle Association.

Summary
It traces back to the history of the NRA and their powerful influence fueled by the narrative of fear.

Interviews
 Bill Clinton
 David Keene
 Lucy McBath
 Fred Guttenberg
 X Gonzalez

Reception
On Rotten Tomatoes the film has a 100% based on reviews from 7 critics. On Metacritic it has a score of 77% based on reviews from 4 critics.

Owen Gleiberman of Variety called it "An absorbing, disturbing, and scrupulously well-researched documentary that lays out the nuts and bolts of the National Rifle Association's history."
Gary Goldstein of the Los Angeles Times wrote: "Clear-eyed, compassionate and compelling, the documentary "The Price of Freedom" efficiently unpacks and debunks the myths it posits the National Rifle Assn. of America has deployed to further its all-guns-all-the-time agenda and foster a culture war."

See also
 Bowling for Columbine 
 Gun violence

References

External links
 
 
 Official trailer

2021 films
2021 documentary films
American documentary films
Gun politics in the United States
National Rifle Association
2020s English-language films
2020s American films